The One Party (stylised as ONE Party) is a Christian fundamentalist political party in New Zealand, co-led by Ian Johnson, Allan Cawood and Kariana Black. The party has stated that New Zealand is a "Christian nation", and should be run as such. Its policies include opposing abortion and euthanasia.

Former co-leader Stephanie Harawira incorporated One Party Limited as a New Zealand limited company in September 2019. It contested the 2020 general election, receiving 0.3% of the party vote.

Ideology and structure 
The One Party believes that God should be above politicians, and envisages its MPs entering Parliament if elected but answerable to an Apostolic Council of religious leaders from various faiths and cultural backgrounds. The party generally leans towards the pentecostal and evangelical wing of Christianity, though founder Stephanie Harawira said, "We didn't come together as Baptists, as Anglicans or Methodists. We came together just as people, who love the Lord." Prophecy is important to the party; candidates have spoken of being given a sign or message that it is their destiny to become politicians, and Harawira stated that God has spoken directly to her.

2020 election

The One Party became registered on 9 July 2020. It received a broadcasting allocation of $41,457 for the 2020 election.

The party was to hold its launch at Marsden Cross in Rangihoua Bay (site of the first Christian service in New Zealand, in 1814) on 27 June 2020. It said that it would run 20 candidates in both general and Māori electorates.

The party reached an arrangement with Vision NZ, another Christian-based party. One Party did not stand a candidate in the Waiariki electorate, where Vision's leader Hannah Tamaki ran. In return, Vision NZ promised to not stand a candidate in Te Tai Tokerau. The One Party was approached about joining an alliance of parties that included the New Zealand Public Party, led by Billy Te Kahika, who is also a Christian. However, Harawira has said that their respective parties' kaupapa do not align. The One Party encouraged supporters in electorates where it was not running a candidate to abstain from the electorate vote.

At the election, held on 17 October, the One Party received 8,121 party votes (0.3%) and did not win any electorate seats. This result was not enough to enter Parliament under New Zealand's Mixed Member Proportional electoral system.

2021 leadership change 
As of December 2021, the party is led by three people: Ian Johnson, Allan Cawood and Kariana Black. The party announced the leadership change on 18 October 2021, when founding leaders Stephanie Harawira and Edward Shanly stood down and were replaced with a tripartite leadership, using a leader's ranking of first, second and third.

2022 by-election 
For the 2022 Hamilton West by-election, the One Party announced that it joined with the New Conservative Party to stand a single candidate: Rudi du Plooy, a New Conservative Party member.

Election results

House of Representatives

See also

Christian politics in New Zealand

References

External links
 Official website

2020 establishments in New Zealand
Political parties established in 2020
Christian fundamentalism
Anti-abortion organisations in New Zealand
Christian political parties in New Zealand